Park Tower  may refer to:

Park Tower (Chicago)
Park Tower Condominium (Chicago)
Park Tower (Frankfurt)
Park Tower (Sacramento)
Park Tower (Tampa, Florida)
Park Tower (Washington, D.C.)
Park Tower at Transbay (San Francisco)
 Shinjuku Park Tower (Tokyo)

See also
Park Towers (disambiguation)